Wilhelm Józef Kurtz (anglicised to William Joseph Kurtz; 28 May 1935 – 14 February 2023) was a Polish prelate of the Roman Catholic Church.

Kurtz was born in Kempa, Gau Silesia (now Kępa, Opole Voivodeship). He was ordained to the priesthood as a member of the Society of the Divine Word in 1962. He was appointed bishop of Kundiawa, Papua New Guinea, in 1982, serving until he was named coadjutor archbishop of Madang in 1999. He succeeded Benedict To Varpin as archbishop in 2001, and retired from this position in 2010.

References

1935 births
2023 deaths
Polish expatriates in Papua New Guinea
People from Opole Voivodeship
Divine Word Missionaries Order
20th-century Roman Catholic bishops in Papua New Guinea
21st-century Roman Catholic archbishops in Papua New Guinea
Polish Roman Catholic priests
Roman Catholic archbishops of Madang
Roman Catholic bishops of Kundiawa
Bishops appointed by Pope John Paul II
Polish expatriates
Polish Roman Catholic archbishops